The South Mindanao or Bilic languages are a group of related languages spoken by the Bagobo, B'laan, T'boli, and Tiruray peoples of the southern coast of Mindanao Island in the Philippines. They are not part of the Mindanao language family that covers much of the island. The languages are:
Blaan
Tboli
Tiruray

Reconstructions
 reconstructs Proto-South-Mindanaon using Tboli, Koronadal Blaan, and Sarangani Blaan data. Tiruray and Giangan were not used in Savage's (1986) reconstruction.

Numerals

Notes

References

 
 
 

 
Philippine languages
Mindanao